The 3rd Supreme People's Assembly (SPA) was elected on 8 October 1962 and convened for its first session on 22–23 October 1962. It was replaced on 16 December 1967, by the 4th Supreme People's Assembly.

Meetings

Officers

Chairman

Vice Chairman

Deputies

References

Citations

Bibliography
Books:
 
  
 

3rd Supreme People's Assembly
1962 establishments in North Korea
1967 disestablishments in North Korea